Georgbarsanovite is a very rare mineral of the eudialyte group, formerly known under unaccepted name as barsanovite, with formula . The original formula was extended to show the presence of cyclic silicate groups and domination of silicon at the M4 site. "REE", standing for rare earth elements, are dominated by cerium. Georgbarsanovite characterizes in dominance of manganese at the N4 site. It also differs from most other accepted group representatives in its colour. The mineral was found in nepheline pegmatite nearby Petrelius river, Khibiny massif, Kola Peninsula, Russia. It is named after Russian mineralogist Georg Barsanov.

Notes on chemistry
Georgbarsanovite contains admixtures of fluorine, potassium and yttrium, with traces of titanium, hafnium, and barium.

References

Cyclosilicates
Sodium minerals
Manganese minerals
Calcium minerals
Iron(II) minerals
Zirconium minerals
Niobium minerals
Trigonal minerals
Minerals in space group 160